The Twenty-third Amendment of the Constitution Act 2001 of the Constitution of Ireland is an amendment that permitted the state to become a party to the International Criminal Court (ICC). It was approved by referendum on 7 June 2001 and signed into law on the 27 March 2002. The referendum was held on the same day as referendums on the prohibition of the death penalty, which was also approved, and on the ratification of the Nice Treaty, which was rejected.

Background
The Statute of the International Criminal Court established the International Criminal Court. As its ratification would affect Ireland's sovereignty and powers and functions elsewhere in the Constitution, under the decision of the Supreme Court in Crotty v. An Taoiseach (1987), an amendment was required before it could be ratified.

Changes to the text
Insertion of new Article 29.9:

Oireachtas debate
The Twenty-third Amendment was proposed in Dáil Éireann by Minister for Foreign Affairs Brian Cowen on behalf of the Fianna Fáil–Progressive Democrats coalition government led by Taoiseach Bertie Ahern. It had the support of all parties and it passed final stages in the Dáil on 12 April. It passed final stages in the Seanad on 2 May and proceeded to a referendum on 11 June 2001.

Result

Aftermath
The International Criminal Court came into force on 1 July 2002.

Note on numbering
The Twenty-third Amendment Bill was put to the people with the Twenty-first and Twenty-fourth Amendment Bills. This is because the Twenty-second Amendment of the Constitution Bill was withdrawn by the government during the course of debate in the Oireachtas. There was therefore no Twenty-second Amendment of the Constitution of Ireland, as the title of legislation is not changed on its enactment.

See also
Politics of the Republic of Ireland
History of the Republic of Ireland

References

External links
Twenty-third Amendment of the Constitution Act 2001
Full text of the Constitution of Ireland
Oireachtas Debates: Twenty-third Amendment of the Constitution Bill 2001

2001 in international relations
2001 in Irish law
2001 in Irish politics
2001 referendums
2002 in Irish law
2002 in Irish politics
23
International Criminal Court
23
Rome Statute of the International Criminal Court
June 2001 events in Europe
Amendment, 23